Michele Gaia (born 27 August 1985 in Brescia) is a former Italian racing cyclist.

Palmares
2003
2nd Tre Ciclistica Bresciana
2007
2nd U23 National Road Race Championships
2008
1st Giro della Valle d'Aosta

References

1985 births
Living people
Italian male cyclists
Cyclists from Brescia